Celilo may refer to:

Celilo Canal
Celilo Falls
Celilo Village, Oregon
Celilo Converter Station
The Celilo (tribe) of Native Americans